Traudl Maurer (born 1961) from Mittenwald is a German ski mountaineer and long-distance runner.

Selected results

Ski mountaineering 
 2003:
 1st, German Championship
 1st, Dammkarwurm
 2nd, Mountain Attack marathon
 4th, European Championship team race (together with Judith Graßl)
 7th, European Championship combination ranking
 8th, European Championship single race
 2004:
 3rd, Mountain Attack marathon
 3rd, Dammkarwurm
 2009:
 1st, Wildsaurennen (literally: wild sow race) relay rece (together with Christine Gürtler, Regina Regina and Anita Vogelsberger)

Mountain running 
 2004:
 1st, Lauf Los Tyrol (women class 1)
 2006:
 1st, Lauf Los Tyrol (women class 1)
 3rd, Zugspitzlauf (Zugspitze run)
 2007:
 1st, Lauf Los Tyrol (women class 1)
 5th, Zugspitzlauf

References 

1961 births
Living people
German female ski mountaineers
German female long-distance runners
People from Garmisch-Partenkirchen (district)
Sportspeople from Upper Bavaria